Lutz Stoklasa (born 23 December 1949) is a German former swimmer. He competed at the 1968 Summer Olympics and the 1972 Summer Olympics.

As of 2021, he is a general practitioner in Wyk auf Föhr.

West German championships 
From 1966 to 1975, Stoklasa won eight West German championships:
100 m butterfly stroke: 1966, 1967, 1968, 1969, 1971 and 1975.
200 m butterfly stroke: 1967 and 1968.

References

1949 births
Living people
People from Langewiesen
German male swimmers
Sportspeople from Thuringia
Olympic swimmers of West Germany
Swimmers at the 1968 Summer Olympics
Swimmers at the 1972 Summer Olympics
German male butterfly swimmers
People from Wyk auf Föhr
20th-century German people
21st-century German people